Linguistic and Philosophical Investigations is a peer-reviewed philosophy journal that publishes articles that treat the foundations of language; the journal deals with linguistic and philosophical issues.

Examples of papers 

Nick Bostrom published in the journal in 2006 (vol. 5) ("The Transhumanist FAQ") and in 2005 (vol. 5) ("What is a Singleton?"). Michael Della Rocca published in the journal of 2008 (vol. 7) ("The Identity of Indiscernibles and the Articulability of Concepts").

See also 
List of philosophy journals

External links 
 Journal web site

Philosophy journals
Analytic philosophy literature
English-language journals
Linguistics journals
Logic journals